The Howrah–Jamalpur Express is an Express train belonging to Eastern Railway zone that runs between  and  in India.It is currently being operated with 13071/13072 train numbers on a daily basis.

Service

The 13071/Howrah–Jamalpur Super Express has an average speed of 49 km/hr and covers 467 km in 9h 35m. The 13072/Jamalpur–Howrah Super Express has an average speed of 47 km/hr and covers 467 km in 10h.

Route and halts 

The important halts of the train are:

Schedule

13071/72

Coach composition

The train has standard LCF rakes with max speed of 110 kmph. The train consists of 17 coaches:

 1 AC first-class and AC II tier (composite)
 1 AC II tier
 1 AC III tier
 8 sleeper c
 4 general
 2 guard, second sitting cum luggage/parcel van

Loco traction

Both trains are hauled by a Howrah-based WAP-4 electric locomotive from Howrah to Jamalpur and vice versa.

See also 

 Howrah Junction railway station
 Jamalpur Junction railway station
 Vikramshila Express

Notes

External links 

 13023/Howrah–Gaya Express
 13072/Jamalpur–Howrah Super Express

References 

Rail transport in Howrah
Jamalpur, Bihar
Express trains in India
Rail transport in West Bengal
Rail transport in Jharkhand
Rail transport in Bihar